St. John's Polytechnic in Hubli, Karnataka, India, was founded in 1992.

History
St.John's Polytechnic was started by the Mitra Charitable Trust, composed of the members J.T. Mathias, P.V. Alexander, Mrs. Dorothy Mathias and Mrs. Berna Alexander in the year 1992 with two branches, "Electronics and Communication" and "Computer Science Engineering", recognised by the Government of Karnataka and the Directorate of Technical Education, affiliated to B.T.E., Bangalore, Karnataka and approved by AICTE, New Delhi. In the year 2007 the Vincentian Congregation Fathers were also included with the Mitra Charitable Trust for a better functioning of it. The college has successfully completed 22 years and now has a third branch, "Civil Engineering", established in the year 2011.

Campus
The campus is in Gopankoppa. It has four acres of land with well-furnished infrastructure including a playground behind the college, wide classrooms and well-equipped laboratories.

Educational programs

See also 
 List of educational institutions in Dharwad

External links
 Official website
 Department of Technical Education Karnataka
 All India Council for Technical Education
 Listed among Dharwad district polytechnics, No:466 St.John's Polytechnic, HUBLI

Educational institutions established in 1992
1992 establishments in Karnataka
Engineering colleges in Dharwad